MISA Malawi, registered as the National Media Institute of Southern Africa (NAMISA), is the local chapter of the Media Institute of Southern Africa (MISA), a regional media Non Governmental Organization established to promote and defend media freedom and freedom of expression across southern Africa in line with the Windhoek Declaration of 1991 on promoting a free and pluralistic African press. It was established in 1997.
Since its establishment in 1997, MISA Malawi has implemented a number of projects with funding from local and international partners focusing on various fields including Access to Information, Law Reform, Elections Monitoring and Reporting and the Environment. But the flagship programme for MISA Malawi has been media freedom monitoring, which culminates into annual state-of-the-media reports called 'So This is Democracy?"

References

External links

1997 establishments in Malawi
African journalism
Journalism-related professional associations
Lilongwe
Organizations established in 1997
Organisations based in Malawi